The following lists events that happened during 1992 in Cambodia.

Incumbents 
 Monarch: Heng Samrin (until April 6), Chea Sim (starting April 6)
 Prime Minister: Hun Sen

Events

January

February

March

April

May

June

July

August

September

October

November

December

References

 
1990s in Cambodia
Years of the 20th century in Cambodia
Cambodia
Cambodia